Spring Hill Cemetery is a cemetery in Nashville, Tennessee located at 5110 Gallatin Pike South in the neighborhood of Madison. It holds over 40,000 graves.

Prior to the establishment of the cemetery, the Davidson Academy (a precursor to the University of Nashville) was located in a stone house at this location.

In addition to two British Royal Air Force veterans of World War II, circus performer Ella Harper, US Congressman Richard Merrill Atkinson, and MLB player Red Lucas, the cemetery is the final resting place for numerous notable music performers including the following:

 Roy Acuff: singer, songwriter, music publisher

 Floyd Cramer: piano legend

 Pete Drake: steel guitar player
 Howard "Howdy" Forrester: fiddle player
 John Hartford: singer, fiddler
 Bobby Hebb: soul singer, songwriter, musician, recording artist, performer
 Jan Howard: singer and songwriter

 Jimmy Martin: bluegrass singer
 George Morgan: singer
 Speck Rhodes: country music comedian and entertainer
 Earl Scruggs: bluegrass musician
 Hank Snow: singer
 Billy Marvin Walker: singer
 Kitty Wells: singer
 Keith Whitley: singer
 Beth Slater Whitson: songwriter
 Johnnie Wright: singer and songwriter

References

External links
 
 
 

Cemeteries in Nashville, Tennessee